Laraba is a surname. Notable people with the surname include:

Bob Laraba (1933–1962), American football player as a linebacker and quarterback
Gambo Laraba Abdullahi (born 1951), Nigerian chemist